Solicitors Act (with its variations) is a stock short title used in the United Kingdom for legislation relating to solicitors.

List
The Revenue Solicitors Act 1828 (9 Geo 4 c 25)
The Treasury Solicitor Act 1876 (39 & 40 Vict c 18)
The Solicitors (Ireland) Act 1898 (61 & 62 Vict c 17)
The Colonial Solicitors Act 1900 (63 & 64 Vict c 14)
The Solicitors Act 1922 (12 & 13 Geo 5 c 57)
The Solicitors Act 1932 (22 & 23 Geo 5 c 37)
The Solicitors Act 1934 (24 & 25 Geo 5 c 45)
The Solicitors Act (Northern Ireland) 1938
The Solicitors, Public Notaries, &c., Act 1949 (12 & 13 Geo 6 c 21)
The Solicitors Act 1957 (5 & 6 Eliz 2 c 27)
The Solicitors Act 1965 (c 31)
The Solicitors (Amendment) Act 1974 (c 26)
The Solicitors Act 1974 (c 47)
The Solicitors (Scotland) Act 1933 (23 & 24 Geo 5 c 21)
The Legal Aid and Solicitors (Scotland) Act 1949 (12 & 13 Geo 6 c 63)
The Solicitors (Scotland) Act 1958 (6 & 7 Eliz 2 c 28)
The Solicitors (Scotland) Act 1965 (c 29)
The Solicitors (Scotland) Act 1976 (c 6)
The Solicitors (Scotland) Act 1980 (c 46)
The Solicitors (Scotland) Act 1988 (c 42)

The Solicitors Acts 1839 to 1894 was the collective title of the following Acts:
The Solicitors (Clerks) Act 1839 (2 & 3 Vict c 33)
The Solicitors Act 1843 (6 & 7 Vict c 73)
The Solicitors (Clerks) Act 1844 (7 & 8 Vict c 86)
The Solicitors Act 1860 (23 & 24 Vict c 127)
The Attorneys and Solicitors Act 1870 (33 & 34 Vict c 28)
The Solicitors Act 1872 (35 & 36 Vict c 81)
The Solicitors Act 1874 (37 & 38 Vict c 68)
The Solicitors Act 1877 (40 & 41 Vict c 25)
The Legal Practitioners Act 1877 (40 & 41 Vict c 62)
The Solicitors Remuneration Act 1881 (44 & 45 Vict c 44)
The Solicitors Act 1888 (51 & 52 Vict c 65)
The Solicitors Act 1894 (57 Vict c 9)

The Solicitors (Ireland) Acts 1849 to 1881 was the collective title of the following Acts:
The Solicitors (Ireland) Act 1849 (12 & 13 Vict c 53)
The Solicitors Act 1851 (14 & 15 Vict c 88)
The Attorneys and Solicitors Act (Ireland) 1866 (29 & 30 Vict c 84)
The Attorneys and Solicitors Act 1870 (33 & 34 Vict c 28)
The Solicitors Remuneration Act 1881 (44 & 45 Vict c 44)

See also
List of short titles

References

Lists of legislation by short title and collective title